Power Struggle was an  professional wrestling event promoted by New Japan Pro-Wrestling (NJPW). It took place on November 7, 2020, in Osaka, Osaka, at the Osaka Prefectural Gymnasium. It was the tenth event under the Power Struggle name.

Storylines
Power Struggle features six professional wrestling matches that involve wrestlers from pre-existing scripted feuds and storylines. Wrestlers portray villains, heroes, or less distinguishable characters in the scripted events that build tension and culminate in matches.

Results

References

External links
The official New Japan Pro-Wrestling website

2020 in professional wrestling
21st century in Osaka
Events in Osaka
2020
November 2020 sports events in Japan
Professional wrestling in Osaka